"The More You Live, the More You Love" is a song by A Flock of Seagulls, released as the first single from their third album, The Story of a Young Heart. It is the band's last international hit to date.

The song entered the top 40 in the UK and in several other countries, such as Germany and New Zealand. In the United States, it peaked at numbers 56 and 10 on the Billboard Hot 100 and Mainstream Rock charts respectively. "The More You Live, the More You Love" had similar success in Belgium (Flanders), where it also peaked at No. 10.

The music video was filmed at Giant's Causeway in Northern Ireland.

Track listing 

 7" Jive 62 (UK)

 12" Jive T62 (UK)

Chart positions

References

1984 singles
A Flock of Seagulls songs
1984 songs
Jive Records singles